Jason Lindsey aka "Mr. Science" is a science teacher, author, meteorologist, and one of only seven STEM-Certified Master Trainers in the US.. Lindsey produces and hosts a popular television segment called Hooked on Science. Each year, he performs hands-on science experiments at hundreds of schools and community events throughout the United States. His goal is to make kids inquisitive about the world around them and to get them to develop a long-term interest in science and math. Jason can also be seen forecasting the weather on several local television stations across the US as a freelance broadcast meteorologist. In recent years he has only been seen on WPSD, a television station in Paducah, KY, and WEHT, a television station in Evansville, IN. Jason can also frequently be seen performing science experiments on the Today Show on NBC.

As of 2021, he is a freelance meteorologist at WSIL-TV in Carterville, Illinois.

References

Science teachers
American science writers
Living people
1977 births